Mystik Belle is an independent platform video game by American developer Andrew Bado and released on the Steam storefront on May 15, 2015.  Ports for Xbox One and PlayStation 4 were released on October 3, 2017, published by WayForward Technologies, known for their similar Shantae series.

In 2020, Mystik Belle's PS4 version received a limited physical release through Limited Run Games. WayForward also expressed interest in porting the game for Nintendo Switch once GameMaker Studio integration is implemented on the console. The Switch port was released on September 9, 2021, under the title of Mystik Belle: Enchanted Edition. However, instead of being ported by WayForward like they promised, it, like the Steam version of the game, was published by Last Dimension, who also developed these and the PS4 and Xbox One versions of the game.

Description 
The game is focused on the struggles of Belle MacFae, a freshman student at the Hagmore School of Magic who ends up being blamed for something she didn't do while staying up late to practice her magic.

The game features pixel-art graphics and gameplay ranging between platforming and a point-and-click adventure game, with a sprawling academy to explore and plenty of characters to interact with along the way.

Reception
Reviewing Mystik Belle's PS4 version, Chris Moyse of Destructoid drew parallels with older games such as Dizzy, Seymour and Slightly Magic. He noted the game's short length and low difficulty contributing to a "relaxed vibe," which he said made it an ideal choice for casual gaming audiences and young children. Though Moyse also enjoyed its pixel-art graphics and overall old-school sensibilities, characterizing them as "recalling the halcyon days of the Commodore Amiga" he opined that its "slow pace" felt "quite dated in the modern era" though noted that the option to speed the game's action up by 25% partially negated this flaw. Accordingly, Moyse awarded the game a "Good" score of 7/10. Paul Acevado of Windows Central, reviewing the Xbox One version, similarly praised Mystik Belle's "impressive 16-bit artwork and effects," saying it was reminiscent of classic Sega Saturn titles, although he criticized the "floaty" jump and the game's short length. Drew Leachman of ZGTD similarly criticized the "floaty" platforming, as well as the combat and the limited size of Belle's item inventory, but overall deemed it a "decently fun game" and opined that "you could do a lot worse" for the asking price.

References 

2015 video games
Indie video games
Fantasy video games
Action video games
Linux games
PlayStation 4 games
PlayStation Network games
Werewolf video games
Video games about witchcraft
Video games developed in the United States
Video games featuring female protagonists
Windows games
Xbox One games
Single-player video games
WayForward games